The 2005 Cup of China was the third event of six in the 2005–06 ISU Grand Prix of Figure Skating, a senior-level international invitational competition series. It was held at the Capital Gymnasium in Beijing on November 2–6. Medals were awarded in the disciplines of men's singles, ladies' singles, pair skating, and ice dancing. Skaters earned points toward qualifying for the 2005–06 Grand Prix Final. The compulsory dance was the Tango Romantica.

Results

Men

Ladies

Pairs

Ice dancing

External links
 2005 Cup of China

Cup Of China, 2005
Cup of China
Cup of China
2000s in Beijing
Sports competitions in Beijing